John Bramall (18 August 1923 – 13 June 2000) was an English sound engineer. He was nominated for an Academy Award in the category Best Sound for the film Ryan's Daughter.

Selected filmography
 Ryan's Daughter (1970)

References

External links

1923 births
2000 deaths
English audio engineers
People from Stoke-on-Trent